Mohammad Ami-Tehrani (20 September 1935 – 15 March 2020) was an Iranian middleweight weightlifter. He won bronze medals at the 1962 World Championships and 1966 Asian Games and placed sixth at the 1960 Summer Olympics.

References

1935 births
2020 deaths
Iranian male weightlifters
Olympic weightlifters of Iran
Weightlifters at the 1960 Summer Olympics
Medalists at the 1966 Asian Games
Asian Games bronze medalists for Iran
Weightlifters at the 1966 Asian Games
Asian Games medalists in weightlifting
World Weightlifting Championships medalists
People from Behshahr
Sportspeople from Mazandaran province
20th-century Iranian people